Phobetron hipparchia, the monkey slug, is a moth of the family Limacodidae. It is found in Mexico, Panama, Ecuador, Colombia, Venezuela, the Guianas, Brazil and Argentina.

The larvae feed on Gliricidia sepium.

References

External links
Smithsonian Tropical Research Institute Life cycle images

Moths described in 1777
Limacodidae
Moths of South America
Moths of Central America
Taxa named by Pieter Cramer